To some indigenous peoples of North America, the medicine wheel is a metaphor for a variety of spiritual concepts. A medicine wheel may also be a stone monument that illustrates this metaphor.

Historically, most medicine wheels follow the basic pattern of having a center of stone, and surrounding that is an outer ring of stones with "spokes" (lines of rocks) radiating from the center to the cardinal directions (east, south, west, and north). These stone structures may be called "medicine wheels" by the nation which built them, or more specific terms in that nation's language.

Physical medicine wheels made of stone were constructed by several different indigenous peoples in North America, especially the Plains Indians. They are associated with religious ceremonies. As a metaphor, they may be used in healing work or to illustrate other cultural concepts.

The medicine wheel has been adopted as a symbol by a number of pan-Indian groups, or other native groups whose ancestors did not traditionally use it as a symbol or structure. It has also been appropriated by non-indigenous people, usually those associated with New Age communities.

Nomenclature 

The Royal Alberta Museum (2005) holds that the term "medicine wheel" was first applied to the Big Horn Medicine Wheel in Wyoming, the southernmost archeological wheel still extant. The term "medicine" was not applied because of any healing that was associated with the medicine wheel, but denotes that the sacred site and rock formations were of central importance and attributed with religious, hallowed, and spiritual significance.

As a metaphor, the concept of the sacred hoop of life, also used by multiple Nations, is sometimes conflated with that of the medicine wheel. A 2007 Indian Country Today article on the history of the modern Hoop Dance defines the dancer's hoop this way:
The hoop is symbolic of "the never-ending circle of life." It has no beginning and no end.

Exegesis

Stone structures as sacred architecture 
Intentionally erecting massive stone structures as sacred architecture is a well-documented activity of ancient monolithic and megalithic peoples. 

The Royal Alberta Museum posits the possible point of origin, or parallel tradition, to other round structures such as the tipi lodge, stones used as "foundation stones" or "tent-pegs":
Scattered across the plains of Alberta are tens of thousands of stone structures. Most of these are simple circles of cobble stones which once held down the edges of the famous tipi of the Plains Indians; these are known as "tipi rings." Others, however, were of a more esoteric nature. Extremely large stone circlessome greater than 12 meters acrossmay be the remains of special ceremonial dance structures. A few cobble arrangements form the outlines of human figures, most of them obviously male. Perhaps the most intriguing cobble constructions, however, are the ones known as medicine wheels.

Locality, siting and proxemics 
Stone medicine wheels are sited throughout the northern United States and southern Canada, specifically South Dakota, Wyoming, Montana, Alberta and Saskatchewan. The majority of the approximately 70 documented stone structures still extant are in Alberta, Canada.

One of the prototypical medicine wheels is in the Bighorn National Forest in Big Horn County, Wyoming. This  wheel has 28 spokes, and is part of a vast set of old Native American sites that document 7,000 years of their history in that area.

Medicine wheels are also found in Ojibwa territory, the common theory is that they were built by the prehistoric ancestors of the Assiniboine people.

Larger astronomical and ceremonial petroforms, and Hopewell mound building sites are also found in North America.

Structure, fabrication and patterning 

In defining the commonalities among different stone medicine wheels, the Royal Alberta Museum cites the definition given by John Brumley, an archaeologist from Medicine Hat, that a medicine wheel "consists of at least two of the following three traits: (1) a central stone cairn, (2) one or more concentric stone circles, and/or (3) two or more stone lines radiating outward from a central point."

From the air, a medicine wheel often looks like a wagon wheel lying on its side. The wheels can be large, reaching diameters of 75 feet.

The most common variation between different wheels are the spokes. There is no set number of spokes for a medicine wheel to have although there are usually 28, the same number of days in a lunar cycle. The spokes within each wheel are rarely evenly spaced, or even all the same length. Some medicine wheels will have one particular spoke that is significantly longer than the rest. The spokes may start from the center cairn and go out only to the outer ring, others go past the outer ring, and some spokes start at the outer ring and go out from there.

Sometimes there is a passageway, or a doorway, in the circles. The outer ring of stones will be broken, and there will be a stone path leading in to the center of the wheel. Some have additional circles around the outside of the wheel, sometimes attached to spokes or the outer ring, and sometimes floating free of the main structure.

While alignment with the cardinal directions is common, some medicine wheels are also aligned with astronomical phenomena involving the sun, moon, some stars, and some planets in relation to the Earth's horizon at that location. The wheels are generally considered to be sacred sites, connected in various ways to the builders' particular culture, lore and ceremonial ways.

Other North American indigenous peoples have made somewhat-similar petroforms, turtle-shaped stone piles with the legs, head, and tail pointing out the directions and aligned with astronomical events.

Cultural value, attribution and meaning 
Stone medicine wheels have been built and used for ceremonies for millennia, and each one has enough unique characteristics and qualities that archaeologists have encountered significant challenges in determining with precision what each one was for; similarly, gauging their commonality of function and meaning has also been problematic.

One of the older wheels, the Majorville medicine wheel located south of Bassano, Alberta, has been dated at 3200 BCE (5200 years ago) by careful stratification of known artifact types. Like Stonehenge, it had been built up by successive generations who would add new features to the circle. Due to that and its long period of use (with a gap in its use between 3000 and 2000 years ago, archaeologists believe that the function of the medicine wheel changed over time.

Astronomer John Eddy put forth the suggestions that some of the wheels had astronomical significance, where spokes on a wheel could be pointing to certain stars, as well as sunrise or sunset, at a certain time of the year, suggesting that the wheels were a way to mark certain days of the year. In a paper for the  Journal for the History of Astronomy Professor Bradley Schaefer stated that the claimed alignments for three wheels studied, the Bighorn medicine wheel, one at Moose Mountain in southeastern Saskatchewan, and one at Fort Smith, Montana, there was no statistical evidence for stellar alignments.

Medicine Wheel Park 
Joe Stickler of Valley City State University, North Dakota, with the assistance of his students, began the construction of Medicine Wheel Park in 1992. The Park showcases two solar calendars: "a horizon calendar (the medicine wheel) and a meridian or noontime calendar." According to the Medicine Wheel website, the "large circle measures 213 feet (approximately 65 meters) around. The 28 spokes radiating from its center represent the number of days in the lunar cycle. Six spokes extending well beyond the Wheel are aligned to the horizon positions of sunrises and sunsets on the first days of the four seasons."

See also 
 Medicine wheel (symbol)
 Archaeoastronomy
 Cahokia Woodhenge
 Inukshuk
 Original Keetoowah Society
 Rock art
 Sandpainting
 Temenos

References

Further reading 
 "Medicine Wheels: A Mystery in Stone", written by J. Rod Vickers that appeared in Alberta Past 8(3):6-7, Winter 1992–93.

Books 
 John A. Eddy. "Medicine Wheels and Plains Indian Astronomy", in Native American Astronomy. ed. Anthony F. Aveni (Austin, TX: University of Texas Press, 1977) p. 147-169.
 John A. Eddy. "Medicine Wheels and Plains Indians", in Astronomy of the Ancients. ed. Kenneth Brecher and Michael Feirtag Cambridge, Massachusetts: The MIT Press, 1979, p. 1-24.
 Gordon Freeman. Canada's Stonehenge. Official website.
 E.C. Krupp, Echoes of the Ancient Skies: The Astronomy of Lost Civilizations, (New York, NY: Harper & Row, 1983) p. 141-148.
 Jamie Jobb, The Night Sky Book (Boston, MA: Little, Brown, 1977) p. 70-71.
 Ray F. Williamson, Living the Sky. The Cosmos of the American Indian, (Norman, OK: University of Oklahoma Press, 1984) p. 191-217.

Articles 
 Anthony F. Aveni, "Native American Astronomy". Physics Today Issue 37 (June 1984) p. 24-32.
 Von Del Chamberlain, "Prehistoric American Astronomy". Astronomy Issue 4 (July 1976) p. 10-19.
 John A. Eddy, "Astronomical Alignment of the Big Horn Medicine Wheel", Science Issue 184 (June 1974) p. 1035-1043.
 John Eddy, "Probing the Mystery of the Medicine Wheels", National Geographic 151:1, 140-46 (January 1977).
 O. Richard Norton, "Early Indian Sun-Watching Sites are Real", American West Issue 24 (August 1987) p. 63-70

External links 
 Medicine Wheel Park at Valley City State University
 Stanford University Solar Center Medicine Wheel Page
 A Report on the Medicine Wheel

 
Religious places of the indigenous peoples of North America